Kiryakov, female form Kiryakova, is a surname. Notable people with this surname include:

 Borislav Kiryakov (born 1963), Bulgarian alpine skier
 Iliyan Kiryakov (born 1967), Bulgarian football player
 Ivan Kiryakov (born 1943), Bulgarian boxer
 Kiril Kiryakov (born 1953), Bulgarian water polo player
 Sergei Kiryakov (footballer, born 1998), Russian football player
 Stefani Kiryakova (born 2001), Bulgarian group rhythmic gymnast
 Tanyu Kiryakov (born 1963), Bulgarian pistol shooter
 Virginia Kiryakova, Bulgarian mathematician
 Yegor Kiryakov (born 1974), Russian footballer